The Lord High Steward is the first of the Great Officers of State in England, nominally ranking above the Lord Chancellor.

The office has generally remained vacant since 1421, and is now an ad hoc office that is primarily ceremonial and is filled only for a coronation.

At coronations of the British monarch, the Lord High Steward bears St Edward's Crown. The Lord High Steward has the sole legal power to preside over impeachment trials of peers (which last happened in 1806). The trial of peers by their peers (a law which applied for felonies) was abolished in 1948. In general, but not invariably, the Lord Chancellor was deputised (to act as Lord High Steward) in the felony trials. There was a "Court of the Lord High Steward" which served this purpose when Parliament was not in session.

Initially the position was largely an honorary one. It grew in importance until its holder became one of the most powerful men of the kingdom.  From the late 12th century, the office was considered to be bound with the Earldom of Leicester.  When the House of Lancaster ascended the throne in 1399, Henry IV made his second son, Thomas of Lancaster, Duke of Clarence, Lord High Steward. He held the post until his death in 1421.

The equivalent offices in Scotland and Ireland respectively are the Great Steward of Scotland (always held by the heir to the throne, known in Scotland as the Duke of Rothesay) and the Lord High Steward of Ireland (held by the Earls of Shrewsbury, who are also Earls of Waterford in the Peerage of Ireland).

Lord High Stewards of England, 1154–1421
 1154–1168: Robert de Beaumont, 2nd Earl of Leicester 
 1168–1190: Robert de Beaumont "Blanchemains", 3rd Earl of Leicester 
 1190–1204: Robert de Beaumont "FitzPernel", 4th Earl of Leicester 
 1206–1218: Simon IV de Montfort, 5th Earl of Leicester (son of the sister of the previous)
 1218–1239: uncertain, probably vacant 
 1239–1265: Simon V de Montfort, 6th Earl of Leicester (de facto ruler from )
 1265–1296: Edmund Crouchback, 1st Earl of Leicester and of Lancaster (second son of Henry III & brother to Edward I)
 1296–1322: Thomas, 2nd Earl of Lancaster and of Leicester (Edmund's eldest son; nephew of Edward I)
 1322–1324: uncertain, probably vacant 
 1324–1345: Henry, 3rd Earl of Lancaster and of Leicester (Thomas' younger brother; first-cousin to Edward II)
 1345–1361: Henry of Grosmont, 1st Duke of Lancaster, 4th Earl of Leicester (3rd Earl's son; second cousin to Edward III)
 1362–1399: John of Gaunt, 1st Duke of Lancaster, 6th Earl of Leicester jure uxoris (third son of Edward III and son-in-law of the previous)
 1399: Henry Bolingbroke, 2nd Duke of Lancaster, 7th Earl of Leicester (elder son of John; first cousin to Richard II, whose throne he usurped)
 1399–1421: Thomas of Lancaster, 1st Duke of Clarence (second son of Henry IV (Bolingbroke))

Lord High Stewards of England, 1422–present

Incomplete before 1660.

Coronations

Trials of peers

References

External links
 
 

Constitution of the United Kingdom
 Lord High Steward
Lists of English people